Nusantara Women's Futsal League
is the second-tier competition in the Women's futsal sports competition structure organized by the Indonesian Futsal Federation. This competition started in the 2015 season.

List of champions

List of best players

List of best top-goalscorers

References 

Sports competitions in Indonesia